The Devil's Disciple is a 1987 television film adaptation of the 1897 George Bernard Shaw play of the same title.

Cast and characters

See also
 List of films about the American Revolution
 List of television series and miniseries about the American Revolution

References

External links
 
 

1987 films
American Revolutionary War films
British television films
Canadian drama television films
English-language Canadian films
Films directed by David Jones
Films set in the 1770s
Films set in New Hampshire
Television shows based on plays
Television remakes of films
1980s Canadian films